Vannutelli is an Italian surname. Notable people with the name include:

Luigi Vannutelli Rey, Italian diplomat
Serafino Vannutelli (1834-1915), Italian Roman Catholic cardinal
Scipione Vannutelli (1831–1894), Italian painter
Vincenzo Vannutelli (1836-1930), Italian Roman Catholic cardinal

Italian-language surnames